The Border Amateur Football League is a football league for amateur clubs in the Scottish Borders.

The league was founded in 1936 and is affiliated to the Scottish Amateur Football Association. It currently features 31 teams in three divisions, named A, B and C. Teams from all three divisions compete for the Waddell Cup and (providing they enter) the South Cup and Scottish Amateur Cup. The Border Cup and Beveridge Cup are competed for by teams in the A Division; the Wright Cup and Walls Cup for teams in the B Division and the Sanderson Cup and Collie Cup for teams in the C Division. The Forsyth Cup is a consolation tournament for teams knocked out in the preliminary and first round of the Waddell Cup.

2021–2022 League Members

A League
 Ancrum
 Chirnside United
 Duns Amateurs
 Greenlaw
 Hawick United
 Hawick Waverley
 Langlee Amateurs
 Langholm Legion
 Newtown
 Tweeddale Rovers

B League
 Biggar United
 Coldstream Amateurs
 Earlston Rhymers
 Gala Hotspur
 Hawick Legion
 Jed Legion
 Kelso Thistle
 Leithen Rovers
 Selkirk Victoria
 Stow
 Tweedmouth Amateurs

C League
 Berwick Colts
 Eyemouth United
 Gala Fairydean Rovers
 Highfields United
 Lauder
 Netherdale Thistle
 St. Boswells
 Tweeddale Rovers Colts

References

External links

Football leagues in Scotland
Football in the Scottish Borders
Sports leagues established in 1936
1936 establishments in Scotland
Amateur association football in Scotland